Caribe may refer to:

 Caribe (Venezuelan TV series), a Venezuelan telenovela
 Caribe (American TV series), a 1975 television series produced by Quinn Martin
 Caribe, or Cabir, a computer worm designed for mobile phones
 Caribe (1987 film), a 1987 drama film by director Michael Kennedy
 Caribe (2004 film), a 2004 Costa Rican film
 The Caribe, or Kalina, an indigenous people of South America
 The Caribe, or Island Caribs, an indigenous people of the Caribbean
 The Carib language, the language of the Kalina people
 A local term for piranhas, particularly in Venezuela
 Another name for the Carib language
 Caribé, an album by the Latin Jazz Quintet with Eric Dolphy
 Costa Caribe, a Nicaraguan basketball team

See also
 Carib (disambiguation)
 Caribbean, a region of the Americas